Alert Alçani  (born 12 October 1980) is an Albanian football coach and retired football player. As of October 2019, Alçani is manager of second tier club Burreli.

Playing career

Club
He played as a defender for Partizani Tirana in the Albanian First Division.

References

External links
 

1980 births
Living people
Association football defenders
Albanian footballers
Besëlidhja Lezhë players
KF Vllaznia Shkodër players
KF Teuta Durrës players
KF Skënderbeu Korçë players
KS Lushnja players
FK Partizani Tirana players
Kategoria e Parë players
Kategoria Superiore players
Albanian football managers
KS Kastrioti managers
KS Burreli managers